Karl Ludwig Scheeffer (born 1 June 1859 in Königsberg; died 11 June 1885 in Munich) was a German mathematician and university teacher.

Life
Scheeffer's parents were the protestants Ludwig and Mathilda, née  Broscheit.

In 1875, he was accepted at the Friedrich Wilhelm University of Berlin, where he studied for four years, except two semesters at Heidelberg and Leipzig. On 1 March 1880, he finally received his doctorate from the University of Berlin with the dissertation "Ueber Bewegungen starrer Punktsysteme in einer ebenen n-fachen Mannigfaltigkeit (On motions of rigid point systems in a plane n-fold manifold)". Since initially he did not strive for a university career, he passed the necessary examination for the teaching profession in the subjects of mathematics, physics, philosophical propaedeutics and descriptive natural sciences. After this, he began his pedagogical probationary year at the Friedrich Wilhelm Gymnasium in Berlin at Easter 1881.

During his pedagogical probationary year, Scheeffer realized that he would like to devote his creative energy to science after all. After a trip to the Alps, which was necessary for health reasons, he moved to the Ludwig Maximilian University of Munich. There he habilitated in 1883 or 1884 with the paper "Ueber einige bestimmte Integrale, betrachtet als Funktionen eines komplexen Parameters (On Some Definite Integrals Considered as Functions of a Complex Parameter)" and subsequently became a Privatdozent. While residing in the Briennerstraße, He lectured about "Elements of differential and integral calculus", in the winter term 1884/1885, and on "Selected topic in integral calculus" and "Synthetic geometry" in the summer term 1885, At the age of 26, he died of typhoid fever. Despite the brevity of his life and academic activity, he published a number of important writings and essays.

Selected publications
  
 Ueber einige bestimmte Integrale, betrachtet als Funktionen eines komplexen Parameters. Dreijer, Berlin 1883.
  
 
  (Part I) — Part II (p. 279–296)

References

External links
 Record on Scheeffer's Ph.D. thesis at University of Bielefeld

19th-century German mathematicians
Academic staff of the Ludwig Maximilian University of Munich
Humboldt University of Berlin alumni
1859 births
1885 deaths